Jagananna Vidya Kanuka is a program launched by the Government of Andhra Pradesh to improve the learning outcomes of the students from government schools of Class I to X by providing them a kit that consists two pairs of school uniform, textbooks, notebooks, dictionary, school bag, belt, a pair of shoes and one pairs of socks.

Development 
The scheme was launched by Chief minister of Andhra Pradesh Y. S. Jagan Mohan Reddy on 16 August 2019 with a budget of 750 crores. It covers a total of 47,32,064 students from the state. The educational kits that are to be distributed for the next academic year were personally inspected by Y. S. Jagan Mohan Reddy on 20 September 2021 for quality check.

The scheme 
Jagananna Vidya Kanuka is launched to upgrade the educational stability for the students of Andhra Pradesh on 16th Aug, 2021. In this scheme, all the students from Class I to X of government schools are given a kit that consists of:

 Three pairs of school uniform
 Textbooks
 Notebooks
 English - Telugu Oxford dictionary
 School bag
 Belt
 Pair of shoes
 Two pairs of socks

References 

2021 establishments in Andhra Pradesh
Education in Andhra Pradesh